Trupanea gratiosa is a species of tephritid or fruit flies in the genus Trupanea of the family Tephritidae.

Distribution
Korea, Japan.

References

Tephritinae
Insects described in 1952
Diptera of Asia